"Au pays de Gandhi" ("Gandhi's country") is the 9th song on the 2003 album Mach 6 by French hip hop artist MC Solaar, and the 2nd single. It became a Top Forty hit in France in July. The song describes life in India, and speaks of many cultural aspects. It also remarks upon the physical location of India and neighboring countries (e.g. Pakistan, Bangladesh).

MC Solaar songs
2003 songs